{{DISPLAYTITLE:C11H12O2}}
The molecular formula C11H12O2 (molar mass: 176.21 g/mol) may refer to:

 Allyl phenylacetate
 Centalun
 Cinnamyl acetate
 2,2-Di-2-furylpropane
 Ethyl cinnamate